India Development and Relief Fund (IDRF) is a  Maryland, USA-based 501(c) (3) tax exempt, non-profit organization (EIN: 52-1555563) that supports impoverished people in India, Nepal and Sri Lanka. IDRF's programs span all over India from Jammu and Kashmir to Tamil Nadu, and from Gujarat to Arunachal Pradesh, Nepal and more recently Sri Lanka. Since its inception in 1988, IDRF has disbursed $34 million in grants to various developmental programs pertaining to areas like:  education, health, women's empowerment, eco-friendly development, good governance, and disaster relief/rehabilitation.

History 

IDRF was founded in 1988 by Dr. Vinod Prakash, a former World Bank development economist, who has worked as a volunteer for IDRF since he founded it

IDRF maintains a close collaboration with the Indian American community and helps them realize their dreams of giving back to their “motherland” or" land of their ancestors".

Activities

Some IDRF accomplishments since 1988:

Raised $36.25 million and disbursed $33.69 million
Overheads only 4%, so 96 cents of $1 goes directly to NGOs
2,130 Women's Self-Help Groups supported in 333 villages of Haryana, Maharashtra and West Bengal
2,500 private toilets constructed for rural poor in Gujarat, West Bengal & Tamil Nadu
10,000 students helped in schools/affection homes in 9 states  across India
27,000 students in 400 schools trained to be responsible citizens across 12 cities in India
48 Gram Panchayats in 10 districts of Bihar & Jharkhand trained to access government programs and combat corruption
Supported disaster relief/rehab programs for India Floods, Nepal earthquake, Tsunami, Gujarat earthquake, Odisha Super cyclone, Kargil War and Latur earthquake, etc.

Programs 
Education:

 Skill-development program for unemployed rural youth
 Scholarships to meritorious but disadvantaged girls for higher education
 One laptop per poor rural child & E-pustakalaya  (online digital library)
 Free education & hostel for underprivileged tribal girls
 Day care for children with special needs

Health: IDRF provides health services to poor people living in remote areas. These services are provided either free or at nominal charges.

 Clean India Mission –Swachha Bharat Abhiyan- Rural Sanitation Units in Gujarat, Telangana, West Bengal, Tamil Nadu and Maharashtra
 30 mobile clinic vans in various Indian states
 Home for destitute elderly women and children
 Hospitals, pathology Lab-OPD clinic & dispensaries for rural poor
 Free health screenings for diabetes and yoga camps
 Free health camps for the poor, expectant mothers and infants

Women Empowerment:

 Free education and scholarships 
 Self-Help Groups for economic self-reliance
 Micro-credit to over 5,000 women-led small business enterprises 
 Organic farming and sustainable livelihood 
 Construction of STEM labs in girls’ schools and colleges
 Vocational training programs

Eco-friendly Development: IDRF funds programs that facilitate rural enterprises by incorporating clean-energy technology and practices and also in conservation of biodiversity and natural resources.

 Safe Drinking Water Harvesting and Security in arid areas
 Organic  and efficient farming techniques 
 Eco-friendly micro-enterprises by women- organic café, bakery, soap & candle     making, food preservation, etc.
 Solar power generation, assembly and distribution of solar-powered lanterns

'Disaster Relief/Rehabilitation: Relief-kits have been distributed to hundreds of victims
 Task of resettling the victims by repairing/reconstructing houses
 Providing sustainable development programs in the area to rebuild livelihoodsGood Governance' Increasing women and schedule caste members’ participation in rural local governance 
 Reporting bribery cases via mobile apps
 Community policing
 Training of students to be informed & responsible citizens of tomorrow
 Engagement with NITI Aayog (Government of India).

Controversy

In 2002 a coalition of professionals, students, workers, artists and intellectuals in the US organized "The Campaign to Stop Funding Hate".
A report authored by members of this organization focused on IDRF, which it said "has systematically funded Hindutva operations in India ... is not a secular and non-sectarian organization as it claims to be, but is, on the contrary, a major conduit of funds for Hindutva organizations in India.
According to the report, IDRF was channeling funds to organizations involved in spreading hate against religious minorities and promoting communal violence.

The report, published by Sabrang Communications and the South Asia Citizens Web, was titled The Foreign Exchange of Hate: IDRF and the American Funding of Hindutva.
It investigated how funding raised by IDRF in the USA was being distributed in India. It accused that most of the money went to Sangh Parivar organizations.

Sabrang Communications, which prepared this report against IDRF, was itself alleged to have stolen huge sums of money away from victims of the 2002 Gujarat violence and its owner, Teesta Setalvad is being prosecuted for embezzlement of funds on complaints filed with the police by the very "victims" for whom the funds were collected by Teesta Setalvad from donors in USA and other countries and her appeal is being heard by the Supreme Court of India.

The report said 70% of money was used for "hinduisation/tribal/education" work, mainly to spreading Hindutva beliefs among tribals.
When IDRF filed a tax document in 1989 with the United States Internal Revenue Service, it identified nine organisations as a sample of those it would fund, all of which were associated with  the Rashtriya Swayamsevak Sangh (RSS).
Some of the groups funded by IDRF had been associated with attacks on Muslims and Christians and with forced conversion of tribals to Hinduism.
Angana Chatterji, an anthropology professor helped write the report and said, "We're not saying IDRF is directly involved in communal violence, we're saying that IDRF supports a movement that provokes communal violence".
The US State and Justice departments added IDRF to the list of organizations being investigated for illicit donations and money laundering.  However, the Office of Management and Budget approved IDRF for the 2012 and 2013 Combined Federal Campaign, the US federal government's workplace giving campaign.

Soon after the report was issued, in November 2002, IDRF dismissed the allegations as "pure concoction, untruthful and self contradicting".
In March 2003, in response to the allegations, a team of six Indian-American academicians conducted a thorough investigation and concluded that IDRF was not, in fact, supporting violence or furthering any hateful ideology at all. This team, Ramesh Nagaraj Rao, Narayan Komerath, Beloo Mehra, Chitra Raman, Sugrutha Ramaswami, and Nagendra Rao, called themselves "Friends of India," and issued a report called A Factual Response to the Hate Attack on the India Development and Relief Fund (IDRF). Dr. Vinod and Sarla Prakash met the then Indian Home Minister Mr. Lal Krishna Advani and furnished him detailed information about IDRF's grants to various NGOs in India. Few months later, IDRF was informed by his office that there was no evidence of violation of law against it. They published a hard copy of the report,  IDRF: Let the Facts Speak in 2003.

References

Foreign charities operating in India
Charities based in Maryland
Organizations established in 1988
1988 establishments in Maryland
1988 establishments in the United States